The Chinese Ambassador to Venezuela is the official representative of the People's Republic of China to the Bolivarian Republic of Venezuela.

List of representatives

See also
China–Venezuela relations
Taiwan–Venezuela relations

References 

 
Venezuela
China